HDN may refer to

Medicine
 Hemolytic disease of the newborn, an alloimmune illness
 Hydronephrosis, hydrostatic dilation of the kidney

Places
 Harlesden station,  England, station code
 Yampa Valley Airport, Colorado, US, IATA code

Anime
Hyperdimension Neptunia, a video game series
Hyperdimension Neptunia (video game), a 2010 role-playing video game, the first game in the series

Other
 Hydrodenitrogenation, an industrial chemical process
 Northern Haida language of North America, ISO 639-3 code
 Philippine Human Development Network
 Hdn., an abbreviation for the Greek grammarian Aelius Herodianus